The Media Project is a weekly radio program that provides an inside look at media coverage of current events. Panelists on the discussion-based show include Times Union Editor Rex Smith, WAMC CEO Alan S. Chartock, and Daily Freeman Publisher Ira Fusfeld. The half-hour program is recorded at WAMC's studios in Albany, New York and distributed by National Productions. During the show, the panelists engage in spirited debate on timely media issues. Print, television, radio, and internet media are covered. In addition, mail from listeners is sometimes read and discussed. The theme song of The Media Project is "Newspapermen Meet Such Interesting People", composed by Vern Partlow and sung by Pete Seeger.

Produced and distributed by WAMC's National Productions, The Media Project airs on WAMC on Sunday at 6:00 p.m. and on Monday at 3:00 p.m., and on several other stations throughout the United States.

Panelists
Three panelists appear on each show. Chartock and Smith are on nearly every week, but Fusfeld can be heard on a rotational basis. Chartock served as host of the program in its early years, but that duty was eventually taken up by Smith.

Current
 Alan S. Chartock: President and CEO of WAMC (Northeast Public Radio), Publisher of the Legislative Gazette, and Professor Emeritus at the University at Albany.
 Ira Fusfeld: Publisher of the Daily Freeman.
 Rex Smith: Editor of the Times Union.

Former

A number of panelists have appeared on the show over the years. They include:

 Lydia Kulbida: Former anchor at WNYT, now WTEN anchor at 4 p.m.
 Monte Trammer: Publisher of the Star-Gazette.
 Elisa Streeter: Anchor at WTEN.

See also 
 On the Media

References

External links
Website at WAMC.org

American public radio programs